Universal Religion Chapter 4 is the fourth compilation album in the Universal Religion compilation series mixed and compiled by Dutch DJ and record producer Armin van Buuren. It was released on 5 October 2009 by Armada Music.

The digital download version was released on 21 September 2009 on iTunes and contains edits of the individual songs listed, as well as the full continuous mix.

Track listing

Charts

References

External links
Universal Religion Chapter 4 at Discogs

Armin van Buuren compilation albums
Electronic compilation albums
2009 compilation albums